A drying oil is an oil that hardens to a tough, solid film after a period of exposure to air, at room temperature. The oil hardens through a chemical reaction in which the components crosslink (and hence, polymerize) by the action of oxygen (not through the evaporation of water or other solvents). Drying oils are a key component of oil paint and some varnishes. Some commonly used drying oils include linseed oil, tung oil, poppy seed oil, perilla oil, and walnut oil.  Their use has declined over the past several decades, as they have been replaced by alkyd resins and other binders.

Since oxidation is the key to curing in these oils, those that are susceptible to chemical drying are often unsuitable for cooking, and are also highly susceptible to becoming rancid through autoxidation, the process by which fatty foods develop off-flavors. Rags, cloth, and paper saturated with drying oils may spontaneously combust (ignite) after a few hours as heat is released during the oxidation process.

Chemistry of the drying process 
The "drying", hardening, or, more properly, curing of oils is the result of autoxidation, the addition of oxygen to an organic compound and the subsequent crosslinking.  This process begins with an oxygen molecule (O2) in the air inserting into carbon-hydrogen (C-H) bonds adjacent to one of the double bonds within the unsaturated fatty acid.  The resulting hydroperoxides are susceptible to crosslinking reactions.  Bonds form between neighboring fatty acid chains, resulting in a polymer network, often visible by formation of a skin-like film on samples. This polymerization results in stable films that, while somewhat elastic, do not flow or deform readily. Diene-containing fatty acid derivatives, such as those derived from linoleic acid, are especially prone to this reaction because they generate pentadienyl radicals.  Monounsaturated fatty acids, such as oleic acid, are slower to undergo drying because the allylic radical intermediates are less stable (i.e., slower to form). 

The early stages of the drying process can be monitored by weight changes in an oil film. The film becomes heavier as it absorbs oxygen. Linseed oil, for instance, increases in weight by 17 percent. As oxygen uptake ceases, the weight of the film declines as volatile compounds evaporate. As the oil ages, further transitions occur. A large number of the original ester bonds in the oil molecules undergo hydrolysis, releasing individual fatty acids. In the case of paints, some portion of these free fatty acids (FFAs) react with metals in the pigment, producing metal carboxylates.  Together, the various non-cross-linking substances associated with the polymer network constitute the mobile phases. Unlike the molecules that are part of the network itself, they are capable of moving and diffusing within the film, and can be removed using heat or a solvent. The mobile phase may play a role in plasticizing paint films, preventing them from becoming too brittle. Carboxyl groups in the polymers of the stationary phase ionize, becoming negatively charged and form complexes with metal cations present in the pigment. The original network, with its nonpolar, covalent bonds, is replaced by an ionomeric structure, held together by ionic interactions. The structure of these ionomeric networks is not well understood.

Most drying oils rapidly increase in viscosity after heating in the absence of air. If the oil is subjected to raised temperatures for a long time, it will become a rubbery oil-insoluble substance.

Role of metal catalysts
The drying process is accelerated by certain metal salts, especially derivatives of cobalt, manganese, or iron. In technical terms, these oil drying agents are coordination complexes that function as homogeneous catalysts. These salts are derived from the carboxylates of lipophilic carboxylic acids, such as naphthenic acids to make the complexes oil-soluble.  These catalysts speed up the reduction of the hydroperoxide intermediates. A series of addition reactions ensues. Each step produces additional free radicals, which then engage in further crosslinking. The process finally terminates when pairs of free radicals combine. The polymerization occurs over a period of days to years and renders the film dry to the touch.  Premature action of the drying agents causes skinning of the paint, this undesirable process is suppressed by the addition of antiskinning agents such as methylethyl ketone oxime, which evaporate when the paint/oil is applied to a surface.

Constituents

Drying oils consist of glycerol triesters of fatty acids.  These esters are characterized by high levels of polyunsaturated fatty acids, especially alpha-linolenic acid. One common measure of the "siccative" (drying) property of oils is iodine number, which is an indicator of the number of double bonds in the oil. Oils with an iodine number greater than 130 are considered drying, those with an iodine number of 115–130 are semi-drying, and those with an iodine number of less than 115 are non-drying.

Comparison to waxes and resins
Non-"drying" waxes, such as hard-film carnauba or paste wax, and resins, such as dammar, copal, and shellac, consist of long, spaghetti-like strands of hydrocarbon molecules, which interlace and compact but do not form covalent bonds in the manner of drying oils. Thus, waxes and resins are re-dissoluble whereas a cured oil varnish or paint is not.

Safety 
Rags, cloth, and paper saturated with drying oils may combust spontaneously (ignite) due to heat released during the curing process. This hazard is greater when oil-soaked materials are folded, bunched, or piled together, which allows heat to accumulate and accelerate the reaction. Precautions include: wetting rags with water and spreading them away from direct sunlight; closing them off completely in water inside air-tight metal containers designed for such applications; or storing them immersed in solvents in suitable closed containers. Linseed oil-soaked rags were the cause of the large fire in the One Meridian Plaza 38-story office building resulting in severe structural damage, after which a decision was made to demolish the building.

Although spontaneous combustion has been said to occur with rags soaked in paint thinners, this is not true unless a drying oil is used as a thinner. However, classical paint thinners do not include drying oils. The danger is due to rags soaked in oil-based paints, as it is due to the drying oils in the paints (or varnishes), not thinners per se unless they have been mixed with drying oils such as linseed.

See also
 Blown oil
 Danish oil
 Fat over lean
 Linoleum
 Wood finishing
 Varnish
 Non-drying oil

References

Further reading 
 "Autoxidation". McGraw Hill Encyclopedia. 8th ed. 1997.
 Friedman, Ann, et al. "Painting". www.worldbookonline.com. 2006. 46 Stetson St. #5 Brookline, MA. 10 May 2006
 "History of Oil Paint". www.cyberlipid.org. 5 May 2006 (archived 16 September 2009).
 van den Berg, Jorit D.J. "Mobile and Stationary Phases in Traditional Aged Oil Paint". www.amolf.nl 2002. MOLART. 8 May 2006
 Andés, Louis Edgar, Drying oils, boiled oil, and solid and liquid driers. London: Scott, Greenwood & Co., 1901.

External links 
 Tung and Linseed Oils by Steven D. Russel

Visual arts materials
Painting materials
Wood finishing materials
Oils